Spirits competitions are contests between makers of alcoholic beverages, in which master distillers, brewmasters and vintners compete to substantiate the quality of their products. Liquor, spirits, beer, beverage and wine competitions take place around the world.

Competitions
London Spirits Competition
International Wine and Spirit Competition
Jim Murray's Whisky Bible and Liquid Gold Awards
San Francisco World Spirits Competition

References

Distilled drinks